Hesperus Nunatak is a sharp-pointed nunatak lying  southwest of Titania Peak and about  west of Venus Glacier in the southeastern portion of Alexander Island, Antarctica. It was mapped by the Directorate of Overseas Surveys from satellite imagery supplied by the U.S. National Aeronautics and Space Administration in cooperation with the U.S. Geological Survey, and was named by the UK Antarctic Place-Names Committee from association with Venus Glacier, Hesperus being a variant name for the "evening star," Venus.

See also
 Hengist Nunatak
 Lizard Nunatak
 Stephenson Nunatak

References

Nunataks of Alexander Island